Shenin may refer to:

Communist Party of the Soviet Union (Shenin)
Shanin, a village in Iran
Shenin Qaqazan, a village in Iran